Ceroplesis buettneri is a species of beetle in the family Cerambycidae. It was described by Kolbe in 1863. It is known from Benin, Ghana, the Ivory Coast, and Togo.

References

buettneri
Beetles described in 1863